A municipal seat or cabecera municipal is an administrative center, seat of government, or capital city of a municipality or civil parish with other villes or towns subordinated. The term is used in Brazil, Colombia, Mexico, Guatemala and Venezuela, countries of Latin-America.

Other variations 
In Ecuador is assigned as Canton seat, in Argentina is named Department seat.

See also
 County seat

References

Municipal seat
Municipal seat
Municipal seat
Municipal seat